The 2011 Sacramento State Hornets football team represented California State University, Sacramento as a member of the Big Sky Conference during the 2011 NCAA Division I FCS football season. Led by fifth-year head coach Marshall Sperbeck, Sacramento State compiled an overall record of 4–7 with a mark of 3–5 in conference play, tying for sixth place in the Big Sky. The Hornets played home games at Hornet Stadium in Sacramento, California.

Sacramento State opened the season with a 29–28 win over Oregon State of the NCAA Division I Football Bowl Subdivision (FBS).

Schedule

References

Sacramento State
Sacramento State Hornets football seasons
Sacramento State Hornets football